Paratomarctus is an extinct monospecific genus of the Borophaginae subfamily of canids native to North America. It was about the size of a coyote, and was probably a generalised predator, without the specialised adaptations of most later borophagines.

Paratomarctus was one of the last of the Borophaginae and shared its habitat with other canids, including Borophagus, Epicyon, Carpocyon, Aelurodon, and the true canine, Canis lepophagus. Fossils have been uncovered throughout most of the western United States.

References

zipcodezoo.com 
www.sciencemag.org

Borophagines
Miocene carnivorans
Miocene mammals of North America
Prehistoric carnivoran genera